Elm Park is a London Underground station serving Elm Park in the London Borough of Havering, east London.

The station was opened on 13 May 1935 by the London, Midland and Scottish Railway on the local electrified tracks between Upminster and Barking that were constructed in 1932.

History
The London, Tilbury and Southend Railway constructed a line from Barking to Pitsea through the Elm Park area in 1885, with stations at Dagenham and Hornchurch. The Whitechapel and Bow Railway opened in 1902 and allowed through services of the District Railway to operate to Upminster. The Metropolitan District converted to electric trains in 1905 and services were cut back to East Ham. Delayed by World War I, electrified tracks were extended by the London, Midland and Scottish Railway to Upminster and through services resumed in 1932. The District Railway was incorporated into London Transport in 1933, and became known as the District line.

The station was opened on 13 May 1935. It opened with a passimeter for quick sale of tickets and in the off peak collection of tickets from one side and sale from the other. A ticket collectors position was provided with stable door, now a bin store. A ticket office was also provided to deal with parcels and also had the electrical fuses and switches. Now a shop, switch room, and computer room. The station had central heating supplied by a coal boiler under the booking hall, a coal chute from a street manhole was used to supply coal. The boiler was later converted to gas, all removed when the new ticket office was built opposite for the Underground ticket system.

The station was the last to be opened on an existing London Underground line (rather than as part of an extension or new line) until Wood Lane on the Hammersmith and City line in 2008.

Design
The station is of similar design to Dagenham Heathway and Upney, but the station canopy is supported by one central pillar and the ramp to the ticket hall is much wider. The platforms are arranged on an island layout with station buildings typical of the 1930s. A long sloping walkway connects the platforms with the ticket hall which is on a road bridge over the line and above general street level.

Location
The station is named after the mid-1930s planned community of Elm Park, in which it is situated. It is located on The Broadway in the London Borough of Havering. The immediate area is a busy, compact shopping district surrounded by extensive residential development to the north and south.

Services and connections
The station is in London fare zone 6. The typical off-peak service from the station is twelve District line trains per hour to Upminster and twelve to Earl's Court, of which six continue to Ealing Broadway and six continue to Richmond. At peak periods the number of trains per hour increases to fifteen and some trains continue from Earl's Court to Wimbledon. Services towards central London operate from approximately 05:00 to 23:45 and services to Upminster operate from approximately 06:00 to 01:30. The journey time to Upminster is seven minutes; to Barking is approximately thirteen minutes, and to Tower Hill is approximately 38 minutes.

London Buses routes 165, 252, 365 and 372 serve the station, providing connections to Collier Row, Havering Park, Hornchurch, Lakeside Shopping Centre, Orchard Village, Rainham and Romford.

References

External links

District line stations
Tube stations in the London Borough of Havering
Former London, Midland and Scottish Railway stations
Railway stations in Great Britain opened in 1935